Greater Reading may refer to:

 the Greater Reading Area of Reading, Pennsylvania, USA
 the Greater Reading Area of Reading, Berkshire, UK